The Spikkestad Line is a 14 kilometre long railway line between Asker and Spikkestad in Norway. It was originally part of the Drammen Line between Oslo and Drammen which was built in 1872. In 1973, Lieråsen Tunnel was built to shorten the Drammen Line, and much of the old line was closed down. The last train on the section between Spikkestad and Drammen ran 2 June 1973. However, the stretch between Asker and Spikkestad was kept as a branch line for local commuter traffic.

Pictures of stations on Spikkestadbanen

 
Drammen Line
Electric railways in Norway
Railway lines in Viken
Railway lines opened in 1872
1872 establishments in Norway
Røyken
Asker